Colonel Oleg Ivanovich Pantyukhov (25 March 1882 – 1973) was the founder of Russian Scouting.

Early years

Oleg Pantyukhov was born in Kiev to a family of a military physician and an anthropologist. From 1892 to 1899 he studied at Tifflis cadet school. During his studies he became a member of the group named Pushkin club. The group was somehow similar to the modern Boy Scouts, e.g. every weekend they were having a hiking trip with camping in the mountains.

From 1899 to 1901, Pantyukhov studied in Pavlovsk Military School. After graduation he became an officer of the Leib Guard 1st infantry battalion stationed in Tsarskoye Selo. In 1908 he married Nina Mikhaylovna Dobrovolskaya, who later became one of pioneers of the Guiding movement in Russia.
In 1910 their son Oleg Olegovich Pantyukhov, who served during World War II as General Eisenhower's official Russian interpreter, was born in Pavlovsk.

Formation of Russian Scouting

In 1908–09 Pantyukhov became acquainted with the works of Baden-Powell and decided to try these ideas on Russian soil. He organized the first Russian Scout troop Beaver (Bobr) in Pavlovsk, a town near Tsarskoye Selo, on 30 April 1909. In the winter of 1910–11 Pantyukhov met Baden-Powell in Saint Petersburg and then visited Scout organisations in England, the Netherlands, Sweden and Denmark.

On the return he wrote the first Russian Scouting books "Памятка Юного Разведчика" (Handbook for the Young Scout) and "В гостях у Бой-скаутов" (Visiting the Boy Scouts) (both 1912). In 1913 he wrote a book named "Спутник Бойскаута" (The Boy Scout Companion). Pantyukhov met Nicholas II and gifted a Scouting badge for Tsarevich Alexei, who formally became a Scout.

In 1914, Pantyukhov established a society called Russian Scout (Russkiy Skaut). The first Russian Scout campfire was lit in the woods of Pavlovsk Park. A Russian Scout song exists to remember this event. Scouting spread rapidly across Russia and into Siberia, and by 1916 there were about 50,000 Scouts in Russia.

During World War I Pantyukhov received a Cross of St. George, was treated in Crimea and became the commander of the "Third Moscow School of Praporshchiks". During the October Revolution he was the leader of the cadets who unsuccessfully defended the Kremlin from Bolsheviks. In 1919 in Novocherkassk (controlled at the time by the White Army), Pantyukhov was unanimously elected the Chief Scout of Russia.

Disbandment and banning of Russian Scouting
With the advent of communism after the October Revolution of 1917, and during the Russian Civil War from 1918 to 1920, most of the Scoutmasters and many Scouts fought in the ranks of the White Army and interventionists against the Red Army. There was a purge of the Scout leaders, many of whom perished under the Bolsheviks. Those Scouts who did not wish to accept the new Soviet system either left Russia for good, like Pantyukhov and others, or went underground. However, clandestine Scouting did not last long. On May 19, 1922, all of those newly created organizations were united into the Young Pioneer organization of the Soviet Union (it existed until 1990). Since that year, Scouting in the Soviet Union was banned. However, scouting returned to Russia in 2004.

Russian Scouting in exile

The organization Русский Скаут then went into exile, and continued in many countries where fleeing White Russian émigrés settled, establishing groups in France, Serbia, Bulgaria, Argentina, Chile, and Paraguay. A much larger mass of Russian Scouts moved through Vladivostok to the east into Manchuria and south into China.

Pantyukhov, his wife Nina and their son Oleg Jr. went to Constantinople.
There were a Russian Scout Bureau in Constantinople and Russian Scout groups were founded in Turkey.
On March 22, 1921 a General Russian Scoutleaders congress took place in Constantinople under the leadership of Pantyukhov. As a result, The Council of Russian Scouts was founded as an umbrella associations for Russian Scout groups working all around the world, that most troops joined.
This Scout association was recognized as a Member of the World Organization of the Scout Movement, in exile, from 1922 to 1945.

As Chief Scout of this association, which later changed its name to National Organization of Russian Scouts, served the Founder of Russian Scouting Pantyukhov.
His wife Nina and later his son Oleg Jr. were also heavily involved in Russian Scouting in Exile. Oleg Pantyukhov Sr. and Nina were personal friends of Robert Baden-Powell and Olave Baden-Powell.

In 1922 Pantyukhov and his family moved to the United States, where large troops of Russian Scouts were established in such California cities as San Francisco, Burlingame, Los Angeles, etc. Pantyukhov is credited with creation of the first Russian Scout group abroad on March 25, 1920. He worked for the Scouting movement up to his death.

He took part in the 3rd World Scout Jamboree in 1929.

Oleg Pantyukhov was appointed to the Chief Scout of the Organization of Russian Young Pathfinders in November 1945 and so he was at this time the Chief Scout of both Russian Scouts-in-exile associations. He tried to unite the associations, but it failed and so he resigned as Chief Scout from ORYuR in 1957.

Later life
His wife Nina died in New York on January 12, 1944.

After World War II Pantyukhov went to Nice, France where he died in 1973.

See also

Scouting in Russia

References

Scouting in Russia
Russian military personnel
American people of Russian descent
1882 births
1973 deaths
Scouting pioneers
Emigrants from the Russian Empire to France
White Russian emigrants to France
White Russian emigrants to the United States
Chief Scouts